The South Amboy Public Schools are a comprehensive community public school district that serve students in pre-kindergarten through twelfth grade from South Amboy, in Middlesex County, New Jersey, United States.

As of the 2020–21 school year, the district, comprised of two schools, had an enrollment of 1,100 students and 81.0 classroom teachers (on an FTE basis), for a student–teacher ratio of 13.6:1.

The district is classified by the New Jersey Department of Education as being in District Factor Group "CD", the sixth-highest of eight groupings. District Factor Groups organize districts statewide to allow comparison by common socioeconomic characteristics of the local districts. From lowest socioeconomic status to highest, the categories are A, B, CD, DE, FG, GH, I and J.

Awards and recognition
NAMM named the district in its 2008 survey of the "Best Communities for Music Education", which included 110 school districts nationwide.

Schools
Schools in the district (with 2020–21 enrollment data from the National Center for Education Statistics) are:
South Amboy Elementary School with 514 students in grades PreK-5
South Amboy Middle High School with 559 students in grades 6-12

Administration
Core members of the district's administration are:
Dr. Frederick D. Williams, Superintendent
Peter Frascella, Business Administrator / Board Secretary

Board of education
The district's board of education, comprised of nine members, sets policy and oversees the fiscal and educational operation of the district through its administration. As a Type II school district, the board's trustees are elected directly by voters to serve three-year terms of office on a staggered basis, with three seats up for election each year held (since 2014) as part of the November general election. The board appoints a superintendent to oversee the day-to-day operation of the district.

References

External links
South Amboy Public Schools
 
School Data for the South Amboy Public Schools, National Center for Education Statistics

South Amboy, New Jersey
New Jersey District Factor Group CD
School districts in Middlesex County, New Jersey